James bin Ratib (born 7 October 1966) is a Malaysian politician who has served as the State Minister of Community Development and People's Wellbeing of Sabah in the Gabungan Rakyat Sabah (GRS) state administration under Chief Minister Hajiji Noor since January 2023 and Member of the Sabah State Legislative Assembly (MLA) for Sugut since May 2013. He served as the State Assistant Minister of Agriculture and Fisheries of Sabah in the GRS state administration under Hajiji and Minister Jeffrey Kitingan from October 2020 to his promotion to full ministership of a different portfolio in January 2023. He is a member of the Parti Gagasan Rakyat Sabah (GAGASAN), a major component party of the Gabungan Rakyat Sabah (GRS) coalition and was formerly a member of the United Progressive Kinabalu Organisation (UPKO).

Election results

Honours 
  :
  Commander of the Order of Kinabalu (PGDK) - Datuk (2011)

References

Members of the Sabah State Legislative Assembly
Kadazan-Dusun people
United Malays National Organisation politicians
Living people
1966 births